Wu Chao (born September 7, 1987 in Jilin) is a Chinese freestyle skier, specializing in aerials.

Wu competed at the 2014 Winter Olympics for China. He placed 5th in the first qualifying round in the aerials, advancing to the final. In the first jump of the three-jump final, he finished 11th, not enough to advance further.

As of April 2014, his best showing at the World Championships is 8th, in the 2013 aerials.

Wu made his World Cup debut in December 2003. As of April 2014, he has three World Cup podium finishes, his best a silver at Beijing in 2013–14. His best World Cup overall finish in aerials is 7th, achieved three times.

World Cup Podiums

References

1987 births
Living people
Olympic freestyle skiers of China
Freestyle skiers at the 2014 Winter Olympics
Chinese male freestyle skiers
Sportspeople from Jilin City
Universiade medalists in freestyle skiing
Universiade bronze medalists for China
Competitors at the 2009 Winter Universiade
Skiers from Jilin